Starr Lake is a small meltwater lake which is a source of water for McMurdo Station on Ross Island. The name Starr Lake came into general use at McMurdo Station for this feature in the early 1970s. It is named after James W. Starr, steelworker, U.S. Navy, who was closely associated with the development of the lake as a source of station water.

Lakes of Ross Island